Atty may refer to:

Slang 
Attorney (disambiguation)
Slang for atomizer, a component of an electronic cigarette 
Slang for Attleborough, Norfolk

Surname 
Alex Atty (1916–1973), American football offensive lineman
Atty Persse (1869–1960), British racehorse trainer